The 2021–22 Moldovan Women Top League was the 22nd season of the highest women's football league in Moldova. The competition started on 12 September 2021 and ended on 29 May 2022.

Teams

Teams
On 20 October 2021 due to withdrawal of Nistru Cioburciu and Narta Drăsliceni, the executive committee changed the format and clubs will play each other three times instead of twice.Nistru withdrew without playing a single game , Narta played two games and lost them both with their results annulled.

League table

Results

Matches 1–10
Teams play each other twice (once home, once away).

Matches 11–15

Teams play every other team once (either at home or away).

Top goalscorers

References

External links
Women Top League - Moldova - Results, fixtures, tables - FMF

Moldovan Women Top League 2020-21
Moldovan Women Top League seasons
Moldova